Thorvald Boye (1 February 1871 – 10 December 1943) was a Norwegian Supreme Court Justice, educator and legal scholar.

Biography
He was born in Arendal to Albert Boye and Johanne Hansen. He graduated as cand.jur. in 1894 and dr. jur. in 1912. 
He continued his studies at the universities of Berlin, Geneva and Paris. From 1913, he worked in the Ministry of Labor and Social Affairs (Sosialdepartementet). He also taught national and international law at the Norwegian Military College  and University of Oslo.
He was named as a Supreme Court Justice from 1922.

Personal life
He was married to Mia Esmarch (1880–1966). They were the parents of diplomat Thore Boye. In 1901, he was awarded the Crown Prince's gold medal (Kronprinsens gullmedalje) by the University of Oslo. He was decorated Commander of the Order of the Dannebrog, Commander of the Order of the Polar Star  and Commander of the Order of Vasa.

Selected works
 Haandbok i folkeret (1918)
Norsk medicinallovgivning (1920)
Kongeriget Norges grundlov (1935)

References

1871 births
1943 deaths
People from Arendal
University of Oslo alumni
Academic staff of the University of Oslo
Academic staff of the Norwegian Military College
Norwegian jurists
Legal educators
Norwegian legal scholars
Norwegian legal writers
Supreme Court of Norway justices
Recipients of the Order of Vasa
Commanders of the Order of the Dannebrog
Order of the Polar Star